Bassina is a genus of bivalve molluscs in the family Veneridae.

Species
 Bassina disjecta (Perry, 1811)
 Bassina foliacea (Philippi, 1846)
 Bassina jacksoni (Smith, 1885)
 Bassina pachyphylla
 Bassina yatei (Gray, 1835)

References
 NZ Mollusca

Veneridae
Bivalves of Australia
Bivalves of New Zealand
Bivalve genera